This is a list of Native American place names in the U.S. state of Oklahoma. Oklahoma has a long history of Native American settlement and reservations. From 1834–1907, prior to Oklahoma's statehood, the territory was set aside by the US government and designated as Indian Territory, and today 6% of the population identifies as Native American. Many of the Indians who were forced to migrate during the Trail of Tears were forcibly relocated to Oklahoma.

Lists

State
 Oklahoma – invented by Chief Allen Wright as a rough translation of "Indian Territory"; in Choctaw, okla means "people", "tribe", or "nation", and homa- means "red", thus: "Red people".
 Oklahoma County
 Oklahoma City
 Oklahoma Lake
 Oklahoma River

Counties

 Atoka County
 Atoka, Oklahoma
 Atoka Lake
 Lake Atoka Reservoir
 Caddo County
 Caddo, Oklahoma
 Canadian County
 Cherokee County – named after the Cherokee people.
 Cherokee, Oklahoma
 Cherokee State Park
 Cherokee Landing State Park
 Grand Lake o' the Cherokees
 Choctaw County
 Choctaw, Oklahoma
 Comanche County
 Comanche, Oklahoma
 Kiowa County
 Kiowa, Oklahoma
 Muskogee County
 Muskogee, Oklahoma
 Nowata County – Lenape – Derived from nuwita "Welcome"
 City of Nowata
 Okfuskee County
 Okmulgee County – Creek language – "Boiling waters"
 City of Okmulgee
 Okmulgee Lake
 Okmulgee State Park
 Osage County
 Osage, Oklahoma
 Osage Hills State Park
 Ottawa County
 Pawnee County
 Pontotoc County
 Pottawatomie County
 Pushmataha County
 Seminole County
 Seminole, Oklahoma
 Sequoyah County
 Sequoyah National Wildlife Refuge
 Sequoyah State Park
 Sequoyah Bay State Park
 Texas County
 Tulsa County – Creek language – Derived from tallasi "Old town"
 City of Tulsa
 New Tulsa, Oklahoma
 Washita County

Settlements

 Agawam, Oklahoma
 Ahpeatone, Oklahoma
 Anadarko – Caddo language – Derived from Nadá-kuh, means "bumblebee place."
 Apache, Oklahoma
 Arapaho, Oklahoma
 Bokchito – Choctaw language – "Big creek"
 Bokoshe – Choctaw language – "little creek"
 Camargo – Cheyenne language – "little dog"
 Catoosa – Cherokee language – phonetically pronounced "Ga-du-si" or "Ga-tu-si". Various interpretations of this word exist, including: "between two hills", "on the hill", "into the hills", and possibly signifying a prominent hill or place thereon.
 Cayuga, Oklahoma
 Chattanooga, Oklahoma
 Checotah, Oklahoma
 Cheyenne, Oklahoma
 Chickasha – Choctaw language – Chickasaw Indian tribe
 Chilocco, Oklahoma
 Coweta, Oklahoma
 Etowah, Oklahoma
 Eucha – Cherokee language – named for Principal Chief Oochalata
 Lake Eucha
 Lake Eucha Park
 Eufaula – Creek language – from the Eufaula tribe, part of the Muscogee Creek Confederacy
 Eufaula Lake
 Gotebo – Kiowa language – named for Kiowa Gotebo (Qodebohon)
 Harjo, Oklahoma
 Hitchita, Oklahoma
 Hochatown, Oklahoma
 Hochatown State Park
 Honobia, Oklahoma
 Inola – Cherokee language – "black fox"
 Kaw City, Oklahoma
 Kaw Lake
 Keokuk Falls, Oklahoma
 Keota – Choctaw language – "the fire gone out"
 Kinta – Choctaw language – "beaver"
 Konawa, Oklahoma – Seminole language – "string of beads"
 Konawa Reservoir
 Kosoma, Oklahoma
 Lenapah, Oklahoma
 Manitou, Oklahoma
 Maramec, Oklahoma
 Miami, Oklahoma
 North Miami, Oklahoma
 Minco, Oklahoma
 Nashoba, Oklahoma
 Neodesha – Osage language – Derived from ni-o-sho-de "The water is smoky with mud"
 Nescatunga, Oklahoma
 New Alluwe, Oklahoma
 Ninnekah, Oklahoma
 Nuyaka, Oklahoma – Creek language – Derived from "New York"
 Oochelata – Cherokee language – named for Principal Chief Oochalata
 Okemah – Kickapoo language – "Things up high"
 Okesa, Oklahoma
 Oktaha, Oklahoma
 Olustee – Creek language – "black water"
 Oologah – Cherokee language – "Dark Cloud"
 Oologah Lake
 Owasso – Osage language – "End of the trail" or "turnaround"
 Pawhuska – Osage language – "White hair"
 Pawnee, Oklahoma
 Pensacola, Oklahoma
 Peoria, Oklahoma
 Pocasset, Oklahoma
 Pocola – Choctaw language – "ten"
 Ponca City, Oklahoma
 Pontotoc, Oklahoma
 Pushmataha Wildlife Management Area
 Quapaw, Oklahoma
 Sapulpa, Oklahoma
 Sasakwa – Seminole language – "wild goose"
 Shawnee, Oklahoma
 Skedee, Oklahoma
 Skiatook, Oklahoma
 Skiatook Lake
 Skullyville – Choctaw language – derivation from iskuli – "money"
 Tahlequah – Cherokee language – "Open place where the grass grows"
 Talala, Oklahoma
 Talihina – Choctaw language – "iron road" (railroad)
 Tamaha – Choctaw language – "town"
 Taloga – Creek language – "beautiful valley" or "rocking water"
 Tamaha, Oklahoma
 Tecumseh, Oklahoma
 Tishomingo, Oklahoma
 Tishomingo National Wildlife Refuge
 Tonkawa, Oklahoma
 Tullahassee, Oklahoma
 Tupelo, Oklahoma
 Tushka – Choctaw language – "warrior"
 Tuskahoma – Choctaw language – "red warrior" 
 Wakita, Oklahoma
 Wapanucka – Lenape language – "Eastern land people"
 Washita, Oklahoma
 Washita National Wildlife Refuge
 Washunga, Oklahoma
 Watonga – Arapaho language – "black coyote"
 Watova, Oklahoma
 Waurika, Oklahoma
 Waurika Lake
 Waynoka, Oklahoma
 Weleetka – Creek language – "Running water"
 Wetumka – Creek language – "Tumbling water"
 Wewoka – Seminole language – "Barking water"
 Wichita Mountains
 Wichita Mountains Wildlife Refuge
 Wyandotte, Oklahoma
 Yahola, Oklahoma
 Lake Yahola (Oklahoma)

Other
 Chickasaw National Recreation Area
 Hulah Lake (Oklahoma)
 Nanih Waiyah Lake
 Neosho River
 Ouachita Mountains
 Ouachita National Forest
 Talimena State Park
 Talimena Scenic Drive
 Wah-Sha-She State Park

See also
List of place names in the United States of Native American origin

References

Citations

Sources

 Bright, William (2004). Native American Placenames of the United States. Norman: University of Oklahoma Press. .
 Campbell, Lyle (1997). American Indian Languages: The Historical Linguistics of Native America. Oxford: Oxford University Press. 

 
Oklahoma geography-related lists
Native American origin in Oklahoma
Native American-related lists